Argentina national hockey team may refer to:

 Argentina men's national field hockey team (Los Leones)
 Argentina men's national ice hockey team
 Argentina national roller hockey team
 Argentina women's national field hockey team (Las Leonas)
 Argentina women's national ice hockey team
 Argentina women's national inline hockey team